Willem J.M. van Genugten (born 30 September 1950, Sint-Oedenrode) is Professor em.  of International Law at Tilburg University. From 2000 to 2015, he has been Visiting Professor at the University of Minnesota, USA. Since 2008, he is Extraordinary Professor of International Law at the North-West University, South Africa. In September 2012, he received a doctorate honoris causa from NWU.

He studied law (graduation in 1977, with distinction) and philosophy (graduation in 1985, cum laude) at the Radboud University Nijmegen. His first job was Head of the Studium Generale Office, Nijmegen University (1977-1985), followed by the position of Lecturer in Theory of Law at Tilburg University. In 1988, he defended his Ph.D. thesis at the Radboud University, where he became a Professor of Human Rights Law in 1991 (until 2006).

He also did hold, i.a., the position of Chair of the standing Commission on Human Rights of the Dutch government and of vice-chair of the Dutch Advisory Council on International Affairs, of which the Commission is a part; of Editor-in-chief of the Netherlands Yearbook of International Law; and of Chair of WOTRO, Science for Global Development (part of the Netherlands Organisation for Scientific Research). As of now (2016), he is i.a. Chair of the Committee on the Implementation of the Rights of Indigenous Peoples of the International Law Association; and Chair of the Royal Netherlands Society of International Law.

In the past he has been, inter alia, Dean of the Law School of Tilburg University (2002-2004 and 2010-2011) and Dean of The Hague Institute for Global Justice (2011-2012). Van Genugten is married and father of three children (1986, 1987, 1991). He received nine best teacher awards. He has published extensively on a variety of issues in international law.

References 

1950 births
Living people
Dutch jurists
Radboud University Nijmegen alumni
Academic staff of Radboud University Nijmegen
Academic staff of Tilburg University
People from Sint-Oedenrode